Larisa Alexandrovna Peleshenko (née Agapova on 29 February 1964) is a retired Russian shot putter best known for winning the Olympic silver medal in 2000. In her early career she won European Indoor silver medals, but in February 1995 she received a four-year drugs ban. Having originally won the 1995 World Indoor Championships, she lost the medal. She won the 2001 Indoor Championships and finished fourth at the World Championships the same year, and retired at the end of the season.

International competitions

See also
List of doping cases in athletics
List of Olympic medalists in athletics (women)
List of 2000 Summer Olympics medal winners
List of IAAF World Indoor Championships medalists (women)
List of European Athletics Indoor Championships medalists (women)
List of masters athletes
Shot put at the Olympics

References

 

1964 births
Living people
People from Slantsy
Sportspeople from Leningrad Oblast
Russian female shot putters
Soviet female shot putters
Olympic female shot putters
Olympic athletes of Russia
Olympic silver medalists for Russia
Olympic silver medalists in athletics (track and field)
Athletes (track and field) at the 2000 Summer Olympics
Medalists at the 2000 Summer Olympics
Universiade medalists in athletics (track and field)
Universiade bronze medalists for the Soviet Union
Medalists at the 1987 Summer Universiade
Goodwill Games medalists in athletics
Competitors at the 2001 Goodwill Games
Competitors at the 1990 Goodwill Games
Competitors at the 1994 Goodwill Games
World Athletics Championships athletes for Russia
World Athletics Indoor Championships winners
European Athletics Indoor Championships winners
Russian Athletics Championships winners
Russian sportspeople in doping cases
Doping cases in athletics
Goodwill Games gold medalists in athletics